Events from the year 1992 in Singapore.

Incumbents
President: Wee Kim Wee
Prime Minister: Goh Chok Tong

Events

January
 3 January – Singapore bans the sale of chewing gum in a bid to prevent disruption to MRT services and reduce gum litter-related issues. This came after two incidents where MRT doors were unable to close fully due to gum. In 2004, the ban is partially lifted for gums with medicinal value.
 10 January – The Ministry of Education announced the Trim and Fit scheme for overweight children.
 28 January – The ASEAN Free Trade Area agreement is signed.

February
 18 February – The International Business Park is launched in Jurong, making it the first business park in Singapore.

April
 April - The Jurong Bird Park Panorail starts operations.
 1 April -
The Institute of Technical Education is established from the previous Vocational and Industrial Training Board (VITB) to improve vocational education, a day after its launch.
Nanyang Polytechnic is formed as Singapore's fourth polytechnic.
The Telecommunication Authority of Singapore is reconstituted, resulting in the corporatisation of SingTel and Singapore Post. SingTel and SingPost will hold a telecommunications licence and postal licence respectively for 15 years.
Tradewinds is rebranded to SilkAir as part of an overhaul, first announced on 12 March.
 2 April – SCV launches NewsVision, a news cable channel. This marks the start of cable television.
 20 April – The Night Courts are set up as part of the Subordinate Courts, which mainly deal with traffic and regulatory offences. This helps ease the workload of dealing with many court cases.

May
 May -
The first Singapore Green Plan is introduced.
The Singapore Green Labelling Scheme is launched to certify products that are friendly to the environment.
 1 May – The National Council of Social Service is formed to coordinate Voluntary Welfare Organisations in Singapore.
 28 May – Yishun 10 is opened as Singapore's first multiplex, owned by Golden Village.

June
 1 June – SCV launches MovieVision and VarietyVision, both of which are entertainment channels.

July
 14 July – Construction for the Woodlands MRT extension starts.

August
 19 August – The first school rankings for secondary schools are published.

September
 1 September – The Inland Revenue Authority of Singapore is formed to take charge of tax collection matters in Singapore.
 10 September – The Special Operations Command is formed to combine the Police Task Force, the Police Tactical Team and the Police Dog Unit into a single command.
 29 September – A fire at the Senoko Power Station cuts power to Singapore for 13 hours.

October
 25 October – Fitzpatrick's Holdings (now Dairy Farm International) announced the acquisition of Cold Storage stores. The deal takes effect the following year.

November
 November - Northpoint Shopping Centre (now Northpoint City) opens to the public.
 1 November – A corrective work order takes effect for litterbugs, which mandates them to clean up areas instead of just paying a fine.
 23 November – Temasek Polytechnic's new campus starts construction in Tampines. The new campus, which offers panoramic views of Bedok Reservoir, will be completed by July 1995. The campus officially opened in 1997.
 28 November – The first school rankings for junior colleges are published.

December
 15 December – The Sentosa Causeway is officially opened. It is a road link that connects Sentosa with mainland Singapore.

Births
 14 January – Benjamin Khoh, lawyer and actor.
 23 February – Tabitha Nauser, Singer, second runner-up of Singapore Idol (Season 3).
 23 March – By2, composed of twins Miko Bai Wei-Fen (白緯芬) and Yumi Bai Wei-Ling (白緯玲).
 7 April – Rahimah Rahim, singer, contestant of Singapore Idol (Season 2).
 25 April – Lynette Lim, swimmer.
 18 August – Quah Ting Wen, swimmer.
 12 September – Shigga Shay, Singer.
 22 September – Julie Tan, Actress.

Deaths 
 6 April – George Edwin Bogaars - Former head of Singapore Civil Service (b. 1926).
 28 October – J. W. D. Ambrose - High Court judge (b. 1909).
 5 December - Andrew Fong Sip Chee former politician (b. 1938).

References

 
Singapore
Years in Singapore